The Melba Gully State Park was formed to protect a small pocket of natural rainforest in the Otway Ranges near Apollo Bay in Victoria, Australia. The  park was extremely valuable as much of the rest of the Ranges has been burnt out many times by bushfires. The park now forms part of the Great Otway National Park.

The gully has a dense rainforest of myrtle beech (Nothofagus cunninghamii), blackwood (Acacia melanoxylon) and tree-ferns, with an understorey of low ferns and mosses. Glow worms (Arachnocampa otwayensis), which are the bioluminescent larvae of small flies known as fungus gnats, can be seen at night along the stream banks and walking tracks.

The park has few facilities due to its small size, but it has a picnic ground and basic picnic facilities, with the main attraction being the 35 minute Madsens Track Nature Walk.

References

State parks of Victoria (Australia)
Otway Ranges
Parks of Barwon South West (region)